The Boundary Trail Railway Company  is a Canadian short line railway company operating in southern Manitoba. Since March 2016, it has also operated with trackage rights on Canadian Pacific Railway's La Riviere sub between Morden and Rosenfeld.

The railway was formed through the investment of CAD$1.25 million by a consortium of about 80 area farmers, the rural municipality of Pembina, Mission Terminal and the provincial government. Originally focused on the transport of wheat, the railway was also in discussion with Quaker Oats to transport oats.

In 2010, after its first year of operation, the railway received the Capturing Opportunities Economic Development Innovation award.

The railway interlines with Canadian Pacific Railway at Rosenfeld in the Municipality of Rhineland.

References

External links

Manitoba railways
Standard gauge railways in Canada